Changwon Station is a train station in Changwon, southeast South Korea. It is on the Gyeongjeon Line and the Jinhae Line. KTX service from Seoul to Masan started with KTX-I / KTX-II trains on December 15, 2010, with Seoul–Changwon travel times between 2 hours 52 minutes and 2 hours 55 minutes.

Location
The station is centrally located in the Dongjeong-Dong (neighbourhood) of Uichang-gu in Changwon.

Station layout

KORAIL
Construction of the new KTX Changwon terminal began on April 24, 2009 and was completed in October, 2010.  The new station covers 4,296 square meters and it is equipped with up-to-date automatic ticket vending machines, 3 elevators, 4 escalators, waiting and vending areas.
The entire convex curved front of the structure is glass covered and the station is considered an architecturally significant building.

Platforms

See also
 Transportation in South Korea

References

Railway stations in South Gyeongsang Province
Korea Train Express stations